Oševljek is a settlement southeast of Renče in the Municipality of Renče–Vogrsko in the Littoral region of Slovenia. In 2002, Oševljek had a population of 187.

Name
The name Oševljek (locally: Oševk) is derived from *olьševikъ 'alder woods', referring to the local vegetation. Related names include Olševek, Oševek, and Viševek (reshaped through folk etymology).

References

External links
Oševljek on Geopedia

Populated places in the Municipality of Renče-Vogrsko